Penicillium velutinum is an anamorph species of fungus in the genus Penicillium which was isolated from soil in the United States. It produces verruculogen, verrucosidin, verruculotoxin, decalpenic acid, dehydroaltenusin, cyciooctasulfur, atrovenetinone, altenusin and penitrem A

Further reading

References 

verruculosum
Fungi described in 1913